Constantine, also spelled Qacentina or Kasantina, is the capital of Constantine Province in northeastern Algeria. During Roman times it was called Cirta and was renamed "Constantina" in honor of emperor Constantine the Great. It was the capital of the French department of Constantine until 1962.

Constantine is regarded as the capital of eastern Algeria and the commercial center of its region, and it has a population of about 450,000 (938,475 with the agglomeration), making it the third largest city in the country after Algiers and Oran. There are several museums and historical sites located around the city. Constantine is often referred to as the "City of Bridges" due to the numerous picturesque bridges connecting the various hills, valleys, and ravines that the city is built on and around.

Constantine was named the Arab Capital of Culture in 2015.

History

Ancient history 

The city was originally founded by the Phoenicians, who called it Sewa (royal city). Later it was renamed Cirta by the Numidian king Syphax, who turned it into his capital. The city was taken over by Numidia, the country of the Berber people, after the Carthaginians  were defeated by Rome in the Third Punic War. In 112 B.C., the city was occupied by the Numidian king Jugurtha, who defeated his half-brother Adherbal. The city later served as the base for Roman generals Quintus Caecilius Metellus Numidicus and Gaius Marius in their war against Jugurtha. Later, with the removal of King Juba I and the remaining supporters of Pompey in Africa, Julius Caesar gave special rights to the citizens of Cirta, now known as Colonia Sittlanorum.

In 311 AD, during the civil war between emperor Maxentius and usurper Domitius Alexander (a former governor of Africa), the city was destroyed. Rebuilt in 313 AD, it was subsequently named in Latin as "Colonia Constantiniana" or "Constantina", after emperor Constantine the Great, who had defeated Maxentius. Captured by the Vandals in 432, Constantine returned to the Byzantine Exarchate of Africa from 534 to 697. It was conquered by the Arabs in the 8th century, receiving the name of Qacentina, It was part of the region known to the Islamic world as Ifriqiya.

Modern history 
The city recovered in the 12th century and under Almohad and Hafsid rule it was again a prosperous market, with links to Pisa, Genoa and Venice. After taking it from the Hafsids in 1529 it was intermittently part of Ottoman Empire, ruled by a Turkish bey (governor) subordinate to the dey of Algiers. Salah Bey, who ruled the city in 1770–1792, greatly embellished it and built much of the Muslim architecture still visible today.

In 1826 the last bey, Ahmed Bey ben Mohamed Chérif, became the new head of state. He led a fierce resistance against French forces, which had invaded Algeria four years later. By 13 October 1837, the territory was captured by France, and from 1848 on until 1962 it was the centre of the Constantine Département. In 1880, while working in the military hospital in Constantine, Charles Louis Alphonse Laveran discovered that the cause of malaria is a protozoan. He observed the parasites in a blood smear taken from a soldier who had just died of malaria. For this, he received the 1907 Nobel Prize for Physiology or Medicine. This was the first time that protozoa were shown to be a cause of disease. His work helped inspire researchers and veterinarians today to try to find a cure for malaria in animals.

In 1934, Muslim anti-Jewish riots, the 1934 Constantine Pogrom, caused the death of 34 local Jews.

During World War II, during the campaign in North Africa (1942–43), Allied forces used Constantine and the nearby cities of Sétif and Bone as operational bases.

Geography 

The city is framed by a deep ravine and has a dramatic appearance. The city is very picturesque with a number of bridges over Rhumel River and a viaduct crossing the ravine. The ravine is crossed by seven bridges, including Sidi M'Cid bridge. Constantine is the railhead of a prosperous and diverse agricultural area. It is also a centre of the grain trade and has flour mills, a tractor factory, and industries producing textiles, wool, linen and leather goods. Algeria and Tunisia serve as its markets.

Climate 

Constantine has a Mediterranean climate (Köppen climate classification Csa), with hot, dry summers and mild, moist winters.

Main sights 

The city is framed by a deep ravine and has a dramatic appearance. In 1911, Baedeker described it as "resembling the Kasba of Algiers, the picturesque charm of which has so far been marred by the construction of but a few new streets."

 El Bey Mosque built in 1703 also known by its post colonial name Souq El Ghezal Mosque.
 The Great Mosque of Constantine historical mosque built in 1136.
 Cirta Museum, previously Gustave Mercier Museum (displays ancient and modern Algerian art)
 Abd al Hamid Ben Badis Mosque
 The Casbah (Kasbah) known locally by the name of Swika
 Emir Abdelkader University and Mosque 
 Soumma Mausoleum
 Massinissa's Mausoleum
 Municipal Library of Constantine
 Ahmed Bey Palace
 Ruins of the Antonian Roman aqueduct
 Ben Abdelmalek Stadium

Nearby are
 the Roman city of Tiddis
 the megalithic monuments and burial grounds at Djebel Mazala Salluste.

The City of Bridges 

The topography of the city is unique and it determines the need for bridges. At the end of the 19th century, Guy de Maupassant wrote: "Eight bridges used to cross this ravine. Six of these bridges are in ruins today." Today the most important bridges are:

 Sidi M'Cid Bridge (1912), a suspension bridge with a length of 168m,
 Bab El Kantra Bridge (1792) bridge which leads toward north,
 Sidi Rached bridge (1912), a long viaduct of 447ms and 27 arches, designed by Paul Séjourné,
 Devil's bridge, a tiny beam bridge,
 Falls bridge (1925), formed by a series of arches on top of a waterfall,
 Mellah Slimane Bridge (1925), a suspension bridge,
 Salah Bey Bridge (Trans-Rhummel viaduct, 2014), the first cable-stayed bridge in Constantine, designed by Dissing+Weitling architecture,
 Meddjez Dechiche Bridge

Education 
Constantine has in general four universities: two of them are downtown Constantine Mentouri Public University, designed by the Brazilian architect Oscar Niemeyer, and Algerian architect Rashid Hassaine, including Zerzara technical engineering pole, Zouaghi Slimane Geography and Earth Sciences Pole, and in the City of El-Khroub is the Institute of Veterinary Sciences. Emir Abdelkader University is one of the biggest Islamic universities with many faculties covering religious studies, foreign languages, literature. Constantine's new town "nouvelle ville ali mendjeli" has two big universities: Université Constantine 2 known as "lella nsoumer" offering maths, computer and economy majors, and the new university is actually a university pole with more than 20,000 students, 17 faculties and more than 40,000 residents. It is now the largest African university under the name of "Université Salah Boubnider" known as "Université Constantine 3".

Transport

Constantine is served by Mohamed Boudiaf International Airport.

Constantine also owns its 14.7 km-long tram network serving the city centre at the airport but also in the main neighbourhoods of the metropolis Constantine tramway.

Twin towns – sister cities

Constantine is twinned with:
 Grenoble, France
 Sousse, Tunisia

Notable people 

Constantine has been the hometown of many noteworthy people in Algeria and France.

 Abdelhamid Brahimi, former Prime Minister of Algeria (1984-1988)
 Abdelhamid Ben Badis, Islamic reformer and philosopher
 Abdelmalek Sellal, former Prime Minister of Algeria two terms (2012-2014),(2014-2017)
 Ahmed Bey, the last Bey of Constantine (1826-1848)
 Ahlam Mosteghanemi, writer
 Alfred Nakache, Olympic champion swimmer and Holocaust survivor.
 Ali Saïdi-Sief, Olympic medallist
 Amar Bentoumi, lawyer, Algerian independence activist, Algerian politician
 Malek Bennabi, philosopher
 Rabah Bitat, the third President of Algeria (1978)
 Sabri Boukadoum, former Minister of foreign affairs and acting Prime Minister
 Mouloud Hamrouche, former Prime Minister of Algeria (1989-1991)
 Djamel Eddine Laouisset, Algerian Scholar
 Masinissa, the first King of Numidia
 Hassiba Boulmerka, athlete, first Algerian woman to win an Olympic title (1992)
 Princess Charlotte, Duchess of Valentinois, the daughter of Louis II, Prince of Monaco, and the mother of Prince Rainier III
 Roger Chauviré (1880–1957), French writer
 Claude Cohen-Tannoudji, Nobel Prize winner in physics
 Sidi Fredj Halimi, Chief Rabbi and rabbinical court president
 Enrico Macias, French singer
 Cheb i Sabbah, DJ, musician and composer
 Jean-Michel Atlan, artist
 Alphonse Halimi, world champion boxer
 Kateb Yacine, writer
 Maurice Boitel, artist
 Sandra Laoura, Olympic medallist
 Malek Haddad, poet
 Moussa Maaskri, actor
 Fadéla M'rabet writer and feminist
 Cherif Guellal, Algerian diplomat, first ambassador to the USA (1963-1967)

Further reading 

 Laura Maravall Buckwalter. 2019. "Factor endowments on the 'frontier': Algerian settler agriculture at the beginning of the 1900s." Economic History Review

References

External links 

 WorldStatesmen- Algeria
 "Constantine (Cirta)"—Catholic Encyclopedia
  The Cascades, Constantine, Algeria
 Images of Constantine in Manar al-Athar digital heritage photo archive

 
200s BC establishments
203 BC
Communes of Constantine Province
Phoenician colonies in Algeria
Province seats of Algeria
Constantine Province